Hermann Ehren (17 October 1894 – 30 November 1964) was a German politician of the Christian Democratic Union (CDU) and former member of the German Bundestag.

Political career  
In 1945, he joined the CDU and in 1946 became chairman of the refugee committee for Westphalia. Ehren belonged to the second appointed state parliament of North Rhine-Westphalia in 1946/47 and was a member of the zone advisory council of the British occupation zone in 1947/48.

In the 1949 Bundestag elections, he ran for election in the Meschede-Olpe constituency, won it and moved to the German Bundestag, where he remained until 1961, having been elected in 1953 and 1957 via the state list. On 4 October 1962 he succeeded Robert Pferdmenges and was again a member of parliament until his death in 1964.

Literature

References

1894 births
1964 deaths
Members of the Bundestag for North Rhine-Westphalia
Members of the Bundestag 1961–1965
Members of the Bundestag 1957–1961
Members of the Bundestag 1953–1957
Members of the Bundestag 1949–1953
Members of the Bundestag for the Christian Democratic Union of Germany
Members of the Landtag of North Rhine-Westphalia